Trevor James Porter (born 16 October 1956) is an English retired professional football goalkeeper and coach who played in the Football League for Brentford.

Playing career

Fulham 
A goalkeeper, Porter began his career at Second Division club Fulham and signed his first professional contract in May 1974, but left the club in 1976 without making a first team appearance.

Slough Town 
Porter dropped into non-league football to sign for Isthmian League First Division club Slough Town prior to the beginning of the 1976–77 season. He was first-choice goalkeeper at the club and racked up 113 appearances before departing at the end of the 1978–79 season.

Brentford 
Injury to Len Bond and a suspension for Graham Cox saw Porter return to the Football League to sign for Third Division club Brentford in August 1978 for a £750 fee. Porter played in the first 13 matches of the season, until the fit-again Len Bond came back into the team. He was kept on for the 1979–80 season and made a further four appearances before being released.

Coaching career 
Porter coached at Conference Premier clubs Crawley Town and Weymouth in the 2005–06 and 2008–09 seasons respectively. He served as goalkeeping coach at Conference Premier club Woking in the early 2010s, before resigning in January 2011.

Personal life 
Since dropping out of professional football in 1976, Porter has run his own window cleaning business in his hometown of Guildford.

Career statistics

References

1956 births
Sportspeople from Guildford
English footballers
Brentford F.C. players
English Football League players
Fulham F.C. players
Slough Town F.C. players
Association football goalkeepers
Living people
Isthmian League players
Crawley Town F.C. non-playing staff
Footballers from Surrey